Gittleman is a surname. Notable people with the surname include:

Ann Louise Gittleman (born 1949), American author and proponent of alternative medicine, especially fad diets
Joe Gittleman (born 1968), American musician

See also
Gettleman